Per Olav Sætre (born 13 March 1977) is a retired Norwegian football midfielder.

He started his career in FK Sykkylven and represented Norway as a youth international. Picked up by Molde FK, he made his Eliteserien debut in September 1995. Playing very sparingly, he was loaned out to Aalesund in 1998 and moved to Hødd in 1999. From 2000 to 2002 he played for Strindheim in Trondheim.

References

1977 births
Living people
People from Sykkylven
Norwegian footballers
Molde FK players
Aalesunds FK players
IL Hødd players
Strindheim IL players
Eliteserien players
Norwegian First Division players
Association football midfielders
Norway youth international footballers
Norway under-21 international footballers
Sportspeople from Møre og Romsdal